Rajiv Gandhi Institute of Technology (RGIT) is a private engineering college affiliated to the University of Mumbai. Founded in 1992, the institute is located in Andheri (west), Mumbai, India. The college is run by the Manjara Charitable Trust and was accredited by the All India Council for Technical Education (AICTE). It is recognised by the Directorate of Technical Education in Maharashtra and the UGC.

Programs offered 

RGIT offers the Bachelor of Engineering (B.E) undergraduate course, which is its flagship course, in seven disciplines. The following degree programs are offered at RGIT, conferred by the University of Mumbai:

 Undergraduate Bachelor of Engineering (B.E.):
Applied Sciences
Computer Engineering
Information Technology
Artificial Intelligence & Data Science Engineering
Mechanical Engineering
Electronics & Telecommunication Engineering
Instrumentation Engineering (Direct Second Year only)
Graduate Master of Engineering (M.E.):
Computer Engineering (Network and Information Security)
Mechanical Engineering (Heat Power)
Electronics & Telecommunication Engineering
Doctoral Ph.D.:
Computer Engineering
Mechanical Engineering
Electronics & Telecommunication Engineering

Extra-curricular activities

College festival
"Zodiac", an inter-collegiate and techno-cultural festival, was started in 2005. Rock concerts, gaming events, the prom night, dance workshops and similar events are held during Zodiac. A technical festival called "Icarus" is generally held in October every year.

The department of Mechanical Engineering hosts "Innovision", an annual technical festival held at the national level, where hardware projects are displayed. "Dimension 5" is a festival conducted by the department of Electronics and Telecommunications Engineering. The Institute also have Social wings and Philanthropic Committees like SOCH RGIT and UBA RGIT for the betterment of welfare.

Clubs and societies
Marathi Bhasha Mandal (Marathi Language Society) was founded for the promotion of Marathi in the college. RGAA (Rajiv Gandhi Alumni Association) was formed in 2007. MESA (Mechanical Engineering Students' Association) formed in 2002 and has been an active departmental committee throughout the year.
IEEE student branch is a technical society for students of all branches and is one of the most active student bodies of the college. Computer Engineering Student's Society (CESS) is the departmental committee of Computer Branch and it conducts various technical workshops and seminars under itself as well as under Association for Computing Machinery (ACM) Student's Chapter. Institute Of Electronics And Telecommunication Engineering (IETE) Student Forum is the departmental committee for Electronics and Telecommunication Department (EXTC). Various technical and non-technical workshops are conducted under it throughout the year.
The student's council is the student body elected by the Principal and Student Conveyors annually to organize the festivals 'Icarus' and 'Zodiac'.

ISA student body is a department specific technical team for instrumentation students.

The college also has drama, fashion and dance clubs. The drama club is also known as 'MUKHAVTE ACJN'. All of these have best working experience and extra co-curriculum .

Co-curricular activities
Memberships of professional societies such as ISA, IEEE, CSI, ABIT, SAE, IETE and ASME are offered to students. MESA (Mechanical Engineering Students Association) was founded in RGIT in 2009.

Notable alumni 

Vicky Kaushal
Ravi Dubey
Tejasswi Prakash
Anshumaan Pushkar
Ayan Mukerji

References

External links
 

1992 establishments in Maharashtra
Affiliates of the University of Mumbai
Educational institutions established in 1992
Engineering colleges in Mumbai
Universities and colleges in Mumbai